Yvon Pierre Lambert (born May 20, 1950) is a Canadian former professional ice hockey forward.

Lambert was born in Drummondville, Quebec. Although drafted in 1970 by the Detroit Red Wings, Lambert started his National Hockey League (NHL) career with the Montreal Canadiens in 1973. He spent nine years in Montreal before being traded to the Buffalo Sabres. Lambert is best known for scoring the winning goal in overtime of game seven of the 1979 Stanley Cup Semi-Finals against the Boston Bruins, the culmination of an exciting game most memorable for a career-damaging coaching error by Don Cherry with two minutes left in regulation. Lambert won four consecutive Stanley Cups with the Canadiens from 1976 to 1979.  Lambert played his final two seasons with the Rochester Americans of the American Hockey League (AHL), winning the 1982-83 Calder Cup. He retired after the Americans lost to the Maine Mariners in Game 5 of the 1983-84 Calder Cup Finals.

After being traded to Montreal, a year after being drafted by the Red Wings, Lambert thought he would never make it to the NHL since the Canadiens had a young and talented squad. It was his desire to get back to Detroit, which had an aging squad at the time, including Gordie Howe and Alex Delvecchio, that made him push himself to perform well with the Port Huron Flags since every young player at time knew they would probably have a chance to replace these players.

After a great season with Port Huron, Ned Harkness, the Red Wings coach, told Lambert that if he stayed in form he would have a good chance to be given another chance with the Red Wings the following season. In August 1972, Lambert was surprised by reading in the newspaper that his services were being kept by the Canadiens. He stated in French, "During the first day at the camp, at the forum of Montreal, there was 80 players and I find myself next to Henri Richard, Yvan Cournoyer, Serge Savard, Jacques Lemaire, and Larry Robinson. Whew! I felt so small".

Career statistics

Fan base
Before a playoff game between the Montreal Canadiens and the Boston Bruins, on May 6, 2014, Lambert met with thousands of fans in front of the Bell Centre in Montreal to encourage them.

Lambert also encourages and helps "Hockey Garage Leagues" to organize games internationally. He has helped with this hockey international company over 28,000 players to play internationally. He has also helped teams by coaching them.

References

External links

1950 births
Living people
Buffalo Sabres players
Canadian ice hockey left wingers
Detroit Red Wings draft picks
Drummondville Rangers players
French Quebecers
Sportspeople from Drummondville
Montreal Canadiens players
Nova Scotia Voyageurs players
Port Huron Flags (IHL) players
Rochester Americans players
Stanley Cup champions
Ice hockey people from Quebec